Elections to Newtownabbey Borough Council were held on 30 May 1973 on the same day as the other Northern Irish local government elections. The election used four district electoral areas to elect a total of 21 councillors.

Election results

Districts summary

|- class="unsortable" align="centre"
!rowspan=2 align="left"|Ward
! % 
!Cllrs
! % 
!Cllrs
! %
!Cllrs
! %
!Cllrs
! %
!Cllrs
!rowspan=2|TotalCllrs
|- class="unsortable" align="center"
!colspan=2 bgcolor="" | UUP
!colspan=2 bgcolor="" | Alliance
!colspan=2 bgcolor="" | DUP
!colspan=2 bgcolor="" | NILP
!colspan=2 bgcolor="white"| Others
|-
|align="left"|Area A
|bgcolor="#40BFF5"|69.3
|bgcolor="#40BFF5"|4
|12.8
|0
|16.8
|1
|1.0
|0
|0.0
|0
|5
|-
|align="left"|Area B
|bgcolor="#40BFF5"|38.0
|bgcolor="#40BFF5"|2
|13.0
|1
|0.0
|0
|13.9
|1
|35.1
|2
|6
|-
|align="left"|Area C
|bgcolor="#40BFF5"|43.8
|bgcolor="#40BFF5"|3
|25.6
|1
|25.0
|1
|5.6
|0
|0.0
|0
|5
|-
|align="left"|Area D
|bgcolor="#40BFF5"|47.6
|bgcolor="#40BFF5"|3
|22.1
|1
|15.8
|1
|2.1
|0
|12.4
|0
|5
|-
|- class="unsortable" class="sortbottom" style="background:#C9C9C9"
|align="left"| Total
|47.8
|12
|18.9
|3
|14.1
|3
|6.1
|1
|13.1
|2
|21
|-
|}

Districts results

Area A

1973: 4 x UUP, 1 x DUP

Area B

1973: 2 x UUP, 1 x Alliance, 1 x NILP, 1 x Loyalist, 1 x United Loyalist

Area C

1973: 3 x UUP, 1 x Alliance, 1 x DUP

Area D

1973: 3 x UUP, 1 x Alliance, 1 x DUP

References

Newtownabbey Borough Council elections
Newtownabbey